= Campeonato Entrerriano de hockey sobre patines =

Roller hockey championship in Argentina

- Founded: 1960??
- Country: Argentina
- Confederation: Confederación Argentina de Patín
- Level on pyramid: 1
- Current champions: Recreativo Bochas Club
- Most championships: Paraná Rowing Club (14)
- Website: UEPH (Unión Entrerriana de Hockey sobre Patines)

El Torneo Entrerriano de Hockey sobre Patines (conocido también simplemente como Torneo Entrerriano) es la máxima competición provincial de hockey sobre patines en la provincia de Entre Ríos, Argentina. Organizado y regulado por la Federación Entrerriana de Patín (FEP) hasta el año 2015, y la Union Entrerriana de Hockey sobre Patines (UEHP) a partir del año 2016. El certamen reúne a los principales clubes de la provincia en sus distintas categorías masculinas y femeninas, tanto en divisiones formativas como en la primera división.

A lo largo de su historia, el torneo se ha consolidado como uno de los polos de desarrollo de la disciplina en la región del Litoral argentino. La competencia otorga a los equipos mejor clasificados las plazas para disputar los torneos de escala nacional organizados por la Confederación Argentina de Patín (CAP), tales como la Liga Nacional A, la Liga Nacional B y los Campeonatos Argentinos de Clubes.

Entre las instituciones más destacadas y con mayor tradición en el certamen se encuentran clubes históricos de la capital provincial, Paraná, así como representantes de otras localidades entrerrianas, convirtiendo al torneo en el eje central de la actividad sobre ruedas en la provincia.

== Listado de Campeones Primera Varones ==
AÑO	CAMPEÓN ANUAL SENIORS
2025	Torneo Local: Recreativo Bochas Club (Rojo)
2024	Torneo Local: Recreativo Bochas Club
2023	Torneo Local: Recreativo Bochas Club
2022	Torneo Local: Recreativo Bochas Club
2021	Torneo Local: Recreativo Bochas Club
2020	(Sin competencia - suspendido por pandemia de COVID-19)
2019	Torneo Local: Recreativo Bochas Club
2018	Torneo Local: Recreativo Bochas Club Torneo Regional: Atlético Neuquen Club
2017	Torneo Local: Atlético Neuquen Club Torneo Regional: Recreativo Bochas Club
2016	Paraná Rowing Club - Creación de UEHP
2015	Paraná Rowing Club - Fin de FEP
2014	Paraná Rowing Club
2013	Recreativo Bochas Club
2012	Paraná Rowing Club (B)
2011	Atlético Neuquen Club
2010	Atlético Neuquen Club
2009	Recreativo Bochas Club
2008	¿Compartido Talleres / Neuquen ?
2007	Club Atlético Talleres
2006	Atlético Neuquen Club (Amarillo)
2005	Atlético Neuquen Club (Amarillo)
2004	Atlético Neuquen Club (Amarillo)
2003	Atlético Neuquen Club (Amarillo)
2002	Atlético Neuquen Club (Amarillo)
2001	Atlético Neuquen Club (Amarillo)
2000	Club Atlético Libertador San Martín
1999	Club Atlético Libertador San Martín
1998	Paraná Rowing Club
1997	Paraná Rowing Club
1996	Atlético Echagüe Club
1995	Paraná Rowing Club
1994	Recreativo Bochas Club
1993	Paraná Rowing Club
1992	Paraná Rowing Club
1991	¿Echagüe, Rowing, Talleres, Recreativo, Universitario, Unión Árabe?
1990	Apertura: Recreativo. ¿Campeón anual? ¿Echagüe, Rowing, Talleres, Recreativo, Universitario o Unión Árabe?-
1989	Paraná Rowing Club
1988	Club Universitario Paraná
1987	Club Universitario Paraná
1986	Recreativo Bochas Club
1985	Don Bosco
1984	Don Bosco
1983	¿Rowing?
1982	Paraná Rowing Club
1981	Paraná Rowing Club
1980	Paraná Rowing Club
1979	Paraná Rowing Club
1978	

== Palmarés general de seniors masculino. ==
Equipo	Campeonatos
Paraná Rowing Club	14
Recreativo Bochas Club	11
Atlético Neuquén Club	10 (1 compartido con Talleres 2008)
Club Atlético Talleres	2 (1 compartido con Neuquen 2008)
Club Atlético Libertador San Martín	2
Club Universitario Paraná	2
Don Bosco	2
Atlético Echagüe Club	1
TOTAL	44
